Canyon Creek is a residential neighborhood located in far northwest Austin, Texas.  The neighborhood is located in ZIP Code 78726 and is bordered by Farm To Market 2222 (FM2222) on the south, Ranch Road 620 North (RR620) on the west, Anderson Mill Road on the north, and a major headwater tributary of Bull Creek to the east as well as the Balcones Canyonland Preserve. The preserve gives the neighborhood of over 1300 homes a semi-rural feeling despite being less than four miles to major shopping and employment centers.  The major bisecting road is Boulder Lane, which winds its way through the picturesque, upper-middle-class neighborhood of single-family homes.  Boulder Lane is a loop, and crosses RR620 in two places (north and south entrances).  The neighborhood is approximately 5 miles from Lake Travis and Lake Austin. Ranch Road 620 runs into the new toll roads of State Highway 45 at Lakeline Mall. Fast ways to get downtown is by taking 620 to 183 and going south. Another fast route is taking 620 to 2222 and then onto 360 to the left or the right. Left will take you to Gateway Theater on 183 and right will take you out to southern Austin and that is also a good route to the airport and San Antonio. 

Canyon Creek was former ranch and hunting land, much of which was once a working cattle ranch owned by former US Congressman Jake Pickle. It was developed by the Blanton Company in the wake of the savings and loan meltdown in the United States in the late 1980s.  Perry Blanton and his company envisioned and developed a completely planned community filled with homes, parks, and connecting trails. It contains significant protected habitat for the golden-cheeked warbler and black-capped vireo, two endangered bird species native to central Texas.  The neighborhood developed rapidly in the 1990s, and was completely built out by 2005.  In the mid-1990s, Round Rock Independent School District authorized the construction of Canyon Creek Elementary School in the neighborhood.

Education

Public Schools

Canyon Creek is served by two School Districts:

Round Rock Independent School District (RRISD)
 Canyon Creek Elementary School, a National Blue Ribbon school
 Grisham Middle School, recently recognized as an International Baccalaurate World School (IB) 
 Westwood High School, an Exemplary high school ranked number 78 in the U.S. News and World
Report survey in 2006

Leander Independent School District
 Grandview Hills Elementary School, an International Baccalaurate World School
 Four Points Middle School
 Vandegrift High School

Private Schools

Canyon Creek has nearby private schools:

 Hill Country Bible School (K-12)
 Summit Christian Academy (K-12)
 Canyon Creek Preschool (birth - 5 years)

Nearby University
 Concordia University Texas (4 year, private, on the grounds of the former Schlumberger corporate campus)

Churches

Nearby religious institutions include:

 Church at Canyon Creek (Southern Baptist Convention)
 St. Thomas More Catholic Church (Austin Diocese, Catholic)
 Hill Country Bible Church (Bible)
 Cypress Creek Community Church (Missionary Church-USA, on the grounds of Summit Christian Academy, Cedar Park)
 Live Oak Unitarian-Universalist Church (UU, Cedar Park)
 Dell Jewish Community Center Campus (containing both conservative and reform Jewish synagogues)
 Peace Lutheran Church (Lutheran, Missouri Synod)

Shopping
Lakeline Mall is less than four miles away, and three large grocery supermarkets (HEB, HEB-Plus, and Wal-Mart) are within two miles. Recently, a large shopping plaza has been constructed nearby as well; it has several restaurants and a movie theater.

The neighborhood is notable for having two parks (Homeowners Association Park and Trailhead Park), nature trails, enormous protected lands surrounding it, close proximity to Austin high technology employers, and a surprisingly diverse population of Anglos, East Asians (primarily Chinese), Asian-Indians, and an active political community.

Canyon Creek In The News
Voter Rights Act controversy and the US Supreme Court:
http://www.foxnews.com/politics/2009/04/25/texas-center-supreme-court-battle-voting-rights/
https://www.wsj.com/articles/SB123820648702763441 
http://travismonitor.blogspot.com/2009/03/canyon-creek-mud-district-case-goes-to.html
https://web.archive.org/web/20090429090826/http://www.statesman.com/news/content/news/stories/local/04/26/0426mud.html

External links
http://www.canyoncreek.net
http://www.balconescanyonlands.org
http://schools.roundrockisd.org/canyoncreek
http://schools.roundrockisd.org/grisham
http://schools.roundrockisd.org/westwood

Neighborhoods in Austin, Texas